Jacques Vandevelde (21 March 1895 – 10 October 1983) was a Belgian footballer. He played in five matches for the Belgium national football team from 1921 to 1923.

References

External links
 

1895 births
1983 deaths
Belgian footballers
Belgium international footballers
Place of birth missing
Association football midfielders